Pimelea graniticola is a species of flowering plant in the family Thymelaeaceae and is endemic to the southwest of Western Australia. It is a shrub with linear leaves and large clusters of erect, cream-coloured or white flowers surrounded by about 40 green involucral bracts.

Description
Flowering occurs between September and December.

Taxonomy
Pimelea graniticola was first formally described in 1988 by Barbara Lynette Rye and the description was published in the journal Nuytsia. The specific epithet (graniticola) means "granite inhabitant" and refers to the habitat of the species.

Distribution and habitat
This pimelea grows on granite outcrops from near Merredin to east of Lake King in the Avon Wheatbelt, Coolgardie, Esperance Plains, Jarrah Forest and Mallee bioregions of south-western Western Australia.

Conservation status
Pimelea graniticola is listed as "not threatened" by the Government of Western Australia Department of Biodiversity, Conservation and Attractions.

References

graniticola
Malvales of Australia
Flora of Western Australia
Plants described in 1988
Taxa named by Barbara Lynette Rye